or officially Hotto Motto Field Kobe is a baseball park in Kobe Sports Park, Kobe, Japan.  It is primarily used for baseball, and is one of two home fields for the Orix Buffaloes, the other being the Kyocera Dome Osaka. The stadium also occasionally hosts Hanshin Tigers when their home field of Koshien Stadium is unavailable.

The stadium's field is one of two ballparks in Japan to have an American-style baseball field: An all-grass outfield and infield, with dirt basepaths. It opened on March 6, 1988 and holds 35,000 people.

Sponsoring names of Kobe Sports Park Baseball Stadium
1988–2002: Green Stadium Kobe (グリーンスタジアム神戸)
2003–2004: Yahoo! BB Stadium (Yahoo! BBスタジアム)
2005–2010: Skymark Stadium (スカイマークスタジアム)
2011 -: Hotto Motto Field Kobe (ほっともっとフィールド神戸)

Kobe Baseball Stadium is the first baseball park in Japan to install naming rights.

Access
Kobe Municipal Subway Seishin-Yamate Line: Sogo Undo Koen Station (S13)

See also
Skymark Airlines
Hotto Motto

References

Orix Buffaloes
Baseball venues in Japan
Buildings and structures in Kobe
Tourist attractions in Kobe
Sports venues in Hyōgo Prefecture
Sport in Kobe
1988 establishments in Japan
Sports venues completed in 1988